The Cathedral of Santa María de Vitoria is a Gothic-style, Roman Catholic cathedral located in Vitoria-Gasteiz, Basque country, Spain. It was declared Bien de Interés Cultural in 1931 and a World Heritage Site (as part of the Camino de Santiago) in 2015.

History

Construction of the cathedral of Santa María in Gothic-style began in the late 13th century and continued throughout the 14th century. It was conceived as a fortress church, with great volume and enclosed appearance, being part of the city's defences.

Between 1496 and 1861, the building operated as a collegiate church, and it was that year when it was declared a cathedral. It has a Latin-cross plan, with a wide transept crossing and circular apse containing several chapels.

The facade's portals are richly decorated with sculpture. The western portico is masterwork consisting of three portals: the central one consecrated to the Virgin, the left one dedicated to San Gil and the right one to the Final Judgement and Saint James.

Nowadays it is being restored within the project of the Santa Maria Cathedral Foundation, which manages guided tours and is in charge of restoration works.

References

External links
 
 Tourist info Cathedral of Santa María de Vitoria

Buildings and structures in Vitoria-Gasteiz
Churches in Álava
Gothic architecture in the Basque Country (autonomous community)
Roman Catholic cathedrals in the Basque Country (autonomous community)
13th-century Roman Catholic church buildings in Spain
Basilica churches in Spain
Bien de Interés Cultural landmarks in Álava
World Heritage Sites in Spain